Insalaco is an Italian surname. Notable people with the surname include:

 Giuseppe Insalaco (1941–1988), Italian politician
 Kim Insalaco (born 1980), American ice hockey player

Italian-language surnames